World Affairs is an American quarterly journal covering international relations. At one time, it was an official publication of the American Peace Society. The magazine has been published since 1837 and was re-launched in January 2008 as a new publication. It was published by the World Affairs Institute from 2010 to 2016, when it was sold to the Policy Studies Organization. Each issue contains articles offering diverse perspectives on global issues and United States foreign policy. World Affairs is headquartered in Washington, D.C. Prior to 1932, the magazine was published monthly and under a variety of names, including The Advocate of Peace. Those articles have since been digitized by JSTOR and are freely viewable up to 1923.

Notable contributors

 Elliott Abrams
 Fouad Ajami
 Ayaan Hirsi Ali
 Andrew Bacevich
 Ian Bremmer
 Helene Cooper
 Jackson Diehl
 Eric Edelman
 Tom Gjelten
 Ethan Gutmann
 Roya Hakakian
 Michael V. Hayden
 Christopher Hitchens
 Robert Kagan
 Mary Kissel
 Charles Lane
 Lewis Libby
 H.R. McMaster
 P. J. O’Rourke
 George Packer
 Richard Perle
 David Rieff
 Marc Thiessen
 Michael J. Totten
 James Traub
 Michael Zantovsky

History of name changes
The journal has undergone a series of name changes since initially published in 1837:
1837-1845: The Advocate of Peace
1847-1884: Advocate of Peace
1889-1892: The American Advocate of Peace and Arbitration
1892-1893: American Advocate of Peace
1894-1920: The Advocate of Peace
1920-1932: Advocate of Peace through Justice
1932-present: World Affairs

See also
Benjamin Franklin Trueblood

References

External links
The Advocate of Peace 1837–1845. JSTOR.
Advocate of Peace (1847-1884). JSTOR.
The American Advocate of Peace and Arbitration (1889-1892). JSTOR.
American Advocate of Peace (1892-1893). JSTOR.
The Advocate of Peace (1894–1920). JSTOR.
Advocate of Peace through Justice (1920-1932). JSTOR.
World Affairs (1932-present). JSTOR.

1837 establishments in the United States
Dupont Circle
Political magazines published in the United States
Bimonthly magazines published in the United States
English-language magazines
Magazines established in 1837
Magazines published in Washington, D.C.
Monthly magazines published in the United States